Change It All is the third studio album by American singer–songwriter Goapele. It was released in 2005.

This album was composed of all-new material and was a forward step in her development as an artist, which was a great expansion in range from her previous effort. However, the much older song "Closer" was included as a bonus track after a gap of silence of 1:15 that occurred between the last two tracks. Guests included Clyde Carson from the Team and Dwele, while Mumia Abu-Jamal appeared in an interviewed voice-over on "Fly Away".

Track listing

Personnel
 Goapele – vocals
 Errol Cooney – guitar (1, 2, 3, 5, 6, 10, 13)
 Michael Aaberg – keyboards, clavinet, guitar, bass guitar (3, 4, 9, 10)
 Jeff Bhasker – vocals, guitar, strings (3, 7, 10)
 Geechi T. – trumpet (1)
 Apollo Novicio – turntables (1)
 Michael Urbano – drums (4)
 Greg Morgenstein – bass guitar (5, 13)
 Clyde Carson – vocals (6)
 Aries Bedgood – vocals (6, 10)
 Jubu – guitar (7)
 Bedrock – drum programming (7)
 Mumia Abu Jamal – vocals (8)
 Sa-Ra Creative Partners – vocals (8)
 Eric Smith – bass guitar (9)
 Dwele – vocals (11)
 Brian Collier – drums (11)
 Anthony Anderson – drum programming (11)
 Monét – vocals (14)
 Traci Nelson – vocals (14)
 Tim Carmon – organ (14)
 Linda Perry – guitar, piano, mellotron (14)
 Eric Schermerhorn – guitar (14)
 Paul Ill – bass guitar (14)
 Brian MacLeod – drums (14)

Charts

References

External links
 

2005 albums
Goapele albums
Columbia Records albums
Albums produced by Linda Perry